Dario Vizinger (born 6 June 1998) is a Croatian professional footballer who plays as a forward for SSV Jahn Regensburg, on loan from Wolfsberger AC.

Club career

Varaždin
Vizinger made his senior club debut for NK Varaždin on 24 August 2014. During the 2014–15 season of the 3. HNL, he scored six goals.

Rijeka
In June 2015, Vizinger signed a contract with HNK Rijeka of the Croatian top division. In his first season with the club, Vizinger mainly featured for Rijeka II in the 3. HNL, scoring seven goals in twenty appearances. On 7 May 2016, he made his official début for the first team, when he entered as a substitute in an away draw against NK Osijek in the 35th round of the 2015–16 season.

Loans
After not making a single appearance in the first half of the 2016–17 season, he was sent on loan to second division side Hrvatski Dragovoljac in February 2017. He made 12 appearances in the Croatian Second Football League for the club, in which he scored twice. For the 2017–18 season, Vizinger was loaned to Slovenian first division club Rudar Velenje, scoring two goals in 12 appearances during the first half of the season.

Celje
In January 2018, the loan was terminated prematurely and Vizinger was signed on a permanent contract by Velenje's league rivals Celje. Initially struggling to find the net, he would make his breakthrough in the 2019–20 season, making 35 league appearances and scoring 23 goals, making him second on the top goalscorers list in the league, only behind Ante Vukušić, as Celje won the league title.  He received the award for the best young player of the season and was named 2019–20 PrvaLiga Team of the Year.

Wolfsberger AC
On 8 September 2020, Vizinger signed a four-year contract with Austrian Bundesliga club Wolfsberger AC. He made his debut on the opening day of the 2020–21 season against Red Bull Salzburg on 13 September 2020, coming off the bench and scoring his first goal in a 3–1 defeat. His team having qualified for the group stage of the 2020–21 UEFA Europa League, Vizinger scored the winner of the 1–0 victory against CSKA Moscow on 3 December 2020.

Honours
Celje
Slovenian PrvaLiga: 2019–20

Individual
Slovenian PrvaLiga Team of the Year: 2019–20
Slovenian PrvaLiga Young Player of the Year: 2019–20

References

External links
 

1998 births
Living people
Sportspeople from Čakovec
Association football forwards
Croatian footballers
Croatia youth international footballers
Croatia under-21 international footballers
NK Varaždin players
HNK Rijeka players
HNK Rijeka II players
NK Hrvatski Dragovoljac players
NK Rudar Velenje players
NK Celje players
Wolfsberger AC players
SSV Jahn Regensburg players
Second Football League (Croatia) players
Croatian Football League players
First Football League (Croatia) players
Slovenian PrvaLiga players
Austrian Football Bundesliga players
2. Bundesliga players
Croatian expatriate footballers
Croatian expatriate sportspeople in Slovenia
Expatriate footballers in Slovenia
Croatian expatriate sportspeople in Austria
Expatriate footballers in Austria
Croatian expatriate sportspeople in Germany
Expatriate footballers in Germany